Granity is a small town on the West Coast of New Zealand's South Island,  north-east of Westport on State Highway 67. Karamea is  further north.

Squeezed between the often-tempestuous Tasman Sea to the west and steep forested cloud-shrouded mountains to the immediate east, the town is the largest in this sparsely populated part of New Zealand. Long known as a coal-mining town, the population has declined as the industry has waned. The population was 168 in the 2018 census, a decrease of 33 from 2013. Several neighbouring towns, such as Denniston, have become virtually ghost towns. In 1911 Granity's population was 589, 641 in 1921 and 547 in 1956. Granity had a railway station on the Westport-Ngākawau Line from 28 Feb1892 until 16 May 1982, though closed to passengers from 14 October 1946. In 1902 it had a staff of 5.

The name "Granity" was given to the town by gold prospectors, in reference to the large quantity of granite in the area.

Demographics
The population of Granity was 168 in the 2018 census, a decrease of 33 from 2013. There were 93 males and 75 females. 94.6% of people identified as European/Pākehā, 12.5% as Māori and 1.8% as Pacific peoples. 14.3% were under 15 years old, 7.1% were 15–29, 53.6% were 30–64, and 25.0% were 65 or older.

The statistical area of Buller Coalfields, which at 499 square kilometres is much larger than Granity, had a population of 909 at the 2018 New Zealand census, a decrease of 78 people (−7.9%) since the 2013 census, and a decrease of 30 people (−3.2%) since the 2006 census. There were 447 households. There were 480 males and 429 females, giving a sex ratio of 1.12 males per female. The median age was 54 years (compared with 37.4 years nationally), with 135 people (14.9%) aged under 15 years, 84 (9.2%) aged 15 to 29, 486 (53.5%) aged 30 to 64, and 204 (22.4%) aged 65 or older.

Ethnicities were 90.1% European/Pākehā, 11.9% Māori, 1.3% Pacific peoples, 1.7% Asian, and 3.6% other ethnicities (totals add to more than 100% since people could identify with multiple ethnicities).

The proportion of people born overseas was 11.9%, compared with 27.1% nationally.

Although some people objected to giving their religion, 60.4% had no religion, 24.8% were Christian, 0.3% were Buddhist and 2.0% had other religions.

Of those at least 15 years old, 78 (10.1%) people had a bachelor or higher degree, and 231 (29.8%) people had no formal qualifications. The median income was $19,600, compared with $31,800 nationally. The employment status of those at least 15 was that 264 (34.1%) people were employed full-time, 93 (12.0%) were part-time, and 39 (5.0%) were unemployed.

Economy 
The Granity Creek Sawmill was established in 1846 and was a significant employer in the area. The town was also the location of the engineering division of the Westport Coal Company, and the railway station was used for loading and dispatching coal from the nearby Millerton mine.

Education
Granity School opened in 1879 in Ngakawau and was later re-located to a site between Ngakawau and Granity. In 1901 it had a roll of 100 pupils.

Biodiversity
The very rare and critically endangered cobble skink is only known to occur on a short stretch of pebbled coast at Granity.

Notable people 
Notable people from Granity include:

 Bub Bridger, writer and performer

Gallery

References

External links

Granity website

Buller District
Populated places in the West Coast, New Zealand